Ivan Kochev (born 8 July 1939) is a Bulgarian volleyball player. He competed in the men's tournament at the 1964 Summer Olympics.

References

1939 births
Living people
Bulgarian men's volleyball players
Olympic volleyball players of Bulgaria
Volleyball players at the 1964 Summer Olympics
Place of birth missing (living people)